Year 725 (DCCXXV) was a common year starting on Monday (link will display the full calendar) of the Julian calendar. The denomination 725 for this year has been used since the early medieval period, when the Anno Domini calendar era became the prevalent method in Europe for naming years.

Events 
 By place 
 Europe 
 Umayyad conquest of Gaul: Muslim forces under Anbasa ibn Suhaym al-Kalbi (governor of Al-Andalus) capture the fortified town of Carcassonne, which has been under siege (see 720), as well as Nîmes in Septimania (the latter without resistance).
 Summer – Anbasa leads a raiding force up the Rhône and Saône Valleys into Burgundy, taking Autun. Muslim raiders reach Sens, Luxeuil and Langres; the cities are devastated. Some Muslims might also have reached the Vosges Mountains. 
 Duke Eudes of Aquitaine seeks an alliance with Munuza, governor of Cerdagne (eastern Pyrenees), currently in rebellion against the central Umayyad government at Córdoba in Andalusia (probably not cemented until 729). 
 Charles Martel invades Bavaria, and kills Duke Grimoald in battle. His son Hugbert submits to Frankish suzerainty, and Charles brings back the Agilolfing princess Swanachild, who becomes his concubine (later his wife). 
 King Liutprand puts Corsica, nominally under Byzantine authority, under Lombard government, defending it from Muslim raids (approximate date).

 Britain 
 The exiled prince Ealdbert, possibly a nephew of King Ine of Wessex looking for recognition as his heir, seeks sanctuary in Sussex. Ine attacks the South Saxons and kills Ealdbert.
 April 23 – King Wihtred of Kent dies after a 35-year reign. The kingdom is divided between his three sons: Æthelbert II as overking, Eadbert I in West Kent and Alric.

 China 
 Yi Xing, Chinese Buddhist monk and astronomer, applies a clockwork escapement mechanism, to provide rotating motion to his astronomical armillary sphere.

 By topic 
 Literature 
 Bede, Northumbrian monk-historian, writes The Reckoning of Time (De temporum ratione), explaining how to calculate medieval Easter.

 Religion  
 In Egypt, resentment of the Copts against Umayyad taxation (called jizya) leads to a revolt (approximate date).

Births 
 Paul the Deacon, Lombard monk (approximate date)
 Stephen the Hymnographer, Syrian monk (d. 807)

Deaths 
 April 23 – Wihtred, king of Kent
 Ealdbert, prince of Wessex
 Grimoald, duke of Bavaria 
 Gwylog ap Beli, king of Powys
 Nothhelm, king of Sussex
 Ruben of Dairinis, Irish scholar

References